See also Bullfight (Manet), The Bullfight, and Bullfight – Death of the Bull

The Dead Man (L'Homme mort; originally entitled The Dead Toreador or Le Torero mort) is an 1860s oil on canvas painting by Édouard Manet, produced during a period in which Manet was strongly influenced by Spanish themes and painters such as Diego Velázquez, Francisco de Goya and bullfighting. On 14 September 1865, Manet wrote to Baudelaire:  Among his other his paintings on the theme are The Matador Saluting and The Bullfight.

The work was originally part of a larger composition entitled Episode from a Bullfight, directly influenced by Goya's La Tauromaquia and Alfred Dehodencq's Bullfights. The canvas was accepted for the 1864 Salon, where many critics identified A Dead Soldier as one of the main inspirations for the figure that became The Dead Man. This was possibly by a Neapolitan artist but attributed to Diego Velázquez and was then in the Hermann Alexander de Pourtalès' collection, later being acquired by the National Gallery, London. In his complete account of the 1864 Paris Salon, Théophile Thoré-Burger even asserted that "the figure of the dead toreador is boldly copied after a masterpiece from the Pourtalès gallery, painted by Vélasquez".  He also insinuated that Manet had directly copied that work, a comment strongly refuted by Baudelaire.

A very large photograph of Dead Soldier had been published by Goupil in 1863 and some even theorised that Manet had seen the original before painting Episode in a Bullfight. Critics also identified as influences Jean-Léon Gérôme's Dead Caesar or even an illustration from the novel Histoire de Gil Blas de Santillane by Jean Gigoux. The main influence, however, was probably  Vélasquez, an influence also to be seen in Manet's The Execution of Emperor Maximilian. The critics also mocked Episode'''s lack of relief, the poor proportions of its figures and the unreal space. Stung by this criticism, Manet cut the canvas up. He kept two parts of the original work — The Dead Man is one of them, though it was subject to a major reworking by Manet after he cut it from the original work, turning it into a powerful independent work. To give it a more universal character he also renamed it to its present name ready for its display at the 1867 Salon. The other part Manet saved is now titled La Corrida — Manet's signature was added to it after his death.

In popular culture
The painting is featured on the cover of Minneapolis New Wave band The Suburbs' 1984 album Love Is the Law''.

References

Bibliography
 
 
 
 
 
 

1864 paintings
1865 paintings
Collections of the National Gallery of Art
Paintings by Édouard Manet
Paintings about death